The Battle: Roar to Victory is a 2019 Korean-Japanese period action film, revolving around the Battle of Fengwudong between Korean independence militias and Japanese forces in 1920 during the Japanese occupation of Korea.

Plot
After the March 1st Movement in 1919, the armed struggle of the independence forces became active in the Bongo-dong area. Armed with new weapons, Japan begins an operation to subdue the independence forces, and the independence forces decide to use the topography of Bongo-dong to overcome the unfavorable situation.

In 1920, when Korea was under Japanese rule, the Korean independence forces’ sword-wielding Hwang Hae-cheol (Yoo Hae-jin) and his subordinates such as sniper Byeong-gu (Jo Woo-jin) carried out the operation to deliver funds to the Korean Provisional Government in Shanghai. During the operation Hwang Hae-chul is reunited with Jang-ha (Ryu Jun-yeol), a young squad commander, who has a suicide mission to bait the Japanese forces led by a general (Kazuki Kitamura) and first lieutenant (Hiroyuki Ikeuchi) into Bongo-dong.

Cast

Main
Yoo Hae-jin as Hwang Hae-cheol (Korean: 황해철, Hwang Hae-cheol)
Ryu Jun-yeol as Yi Jang-ha (Korean: 이장하, I Jang-ha)
Jo Woo-jin as Byeong-gu (Korean: 병구, Byeong-gu)

Supporting
Kazuki Kitamura as Japanese general Yasukawa Jiro (Japanese: 陸軍大将安川次郎, Rikugun-Taishō Yasukawa Jirō)
Hiroyuki Ikeuchi as Japanese first lieutenant Kusanagi (Japanese: 陸軍中尉草薙, Rikugun-Chūi Kusanagi)
 Daigo Kotarō as Yukio
Go Min-si as Hwa-ja (Jang-ha's sister)
Park Ji-hwan as Japanese lieutenant Shigeru Arayoshi (Japanese: 陸軍中尉荒吉茂, Rikugun-Chūi Arayoshi Shigeru)
 Sung Yu-bin as Gae Ddong-yi
 Park Hoon as a member of Jang Ha's unit
 Park Hee-soon as captured independence soldier (special appearance)

Reception
The film had brought a cumulative total of more than 3 million viewers to Korean theaters according to the film's distributor Showbox. It premiered in New York on 16 August 2019.

Awards and nominations

References

External links

2010s Korean-language films
Films directed by Won Shin-yun
Films about battles and military operations
Films set in the Joseon dynasty
Films set in Korea under Japanese rule
Films set in 1920
2010s historical action films
Films set in Jilin
Films about the Korean independence movement
Action films based on actual events
South Korean historical action films
2010s South Korean films